Heteromorpha is the scientific name of two genera of organisms and may refer to:

Hetermorpha (moth), a genus of moths in the family Eupterotidae
Hetermorpha (plant), a genus of plants in the family Apiaceae